Landunvez is a commune in the Finistère department of Brittany in north-western France. Landunvez is twinned with the town of Bradninch in Devon, UK.

Population
Inhabitants of Landunvez are called in French Landunvéziens.

See also
Communes of the Finistère department

References

External links

Official website 

Mayors of Finistère Association 

Communes of Finistère